The Football Queensland Premier League 3 − South Coast, or the FQPL 3 − South Coast, is a men's football competition contested by clubs on the Gold Coast and surrounding areas close to the Queensland−New South Wales border. It is administered by Football Queensland South Coast and it is within the fourth tier of football in Queensland, operated by a system of promotion and relegation. The league is contested by 11 clubs each season, the team that finishes at the top of the league is crowned premiers and they qualify for the FQPL 2 play-offs, whilst the bottom three teams are relegated to the Football Queensland Premier League 4 − South Coast. The teams that finish in the top four qualify for a finals tournament, where the winners of the bracket are crowned champions.

The competition was founded in 1975, with the first season held in the same year. The competition from 1975−1990 had no title and simply acted as the Gold Coast's senior men's football competition, in 1991 the competition was named The Gold Coast Premier League. In 2021, Football Queensland announced a new state system adjustment which would see the league renamed to the current name and an opportunity every season for the premiers to compete for a place in the FQPL 2. 

Currently the league consists of 9 teams from Queensland and 2 teams from New South Wales. Twelve teams have won the premiership and twelve teams have won the championship. The most successful team in the competition is Broadbeach United with 10 premierships and 13 championships. Surfers Paradise Apollo are the current premiers and Southport are the current champions.

Clubs

2022 season

Honours

By team 
Seasons in bold indicate doubles with both the respective premiership and championship in a single season.

By season

President's Cup 
The President's Cup was a knockout football competition played between teams within the Gold Coast Premier League and the inaugural senior Gold Coast competition. The first edition was played in 1976 and the competition was discontinued following the 2006 edition. Below is a list of finals and champions. In an effort to reinstate the competition in 2021, an edition was held as a mid-season competition with Nerang Eagles crowing the latest edition.

By team

By season

See also 

 Football Queensland
 Football Queensland South Coast
Football Queensland Premier League 3 − Metro
Football Queensland Premier League 3 − Darling Downs
Football Queensland Premier League 3 − Sunshine Coast
Football Queensland Premier League 4 − South Coast

Notes

References 

Football Queensland
Soccer leagues in Queensland
Sports leagues established in 1975
1975 establishments in Australia
Sports competitions on the Gold Coast, Queensland
fifth level football leagues in Asia